Andrew Michael Jaffé  (3 June 1923 – 13 July 1997) was a British art historian and curator. He was Director of the Fitzwilliam Museum in Cambridge, England for 17 years, from 1973 to 1990.

Life
Born in London, he was educated at Wagner's and at Eton College. Jaffé's undergraduate studies were delayed for four years by World War II, during which time he served in the RNVR. He came up to King's College, Cambridge in 1945, studying History before changing to English, in which subject he got a First. He became President of the Marlowe Society, and was editor of Granta while a student. After Cambridge, he studied art history at the Courtauld Institute, where he attended Johannes Wilde's lectures and had access to the Seilern Collection; this was followed by research at Harvard on Rubens and his contemporaries.

He became a Fellow of King's College in 1952, holding the position until his death; was appointed as Cambridge University's only Assistant Lecturer in Fine Arts in 1956; and began undergraduate teaching in the subject. He held the post for four years until going to Washington University in St. Louis in 1960, where he was briefly Professor of Renaissance Art until returning to Cambridge University in 1961, when he was appointed Lecturer in Fine Arts. In 1968 he was appointed Reader in History of Western Art, and he became Head of Department of History of Art in 1970, a position he held until 1973 and his appointment to the Directorship of the Fitzwilliam Museum.

Jaffé married Patricia Milne-Henderson in 1964, and they had two sons and two daughters. Jaffé owned the country house Clifton Maybank near Yeovil in Somerset. He was appointed a CBE in 1989. He died on 13 July 1997. A bronze portrait bust of Jaffé by Elisabeth Frink is in the Fitzwilliam.

Selected works
Van Dyck's Antwerp Sketchbook 1966
Rubens 1967
Jacob Jordaens 1593–1678 1968
Rubens and Italy 1977
Rubens: catalogo completo 1989
Old master drawings from Chatsworth 1993
editor of The Devonshire Collection of Italian Drawings 1994

References

External links

Oxford Dictionary of National Biography entry
Dictionary of Art Historians entry for Jaffé
Frink sculpture of Jaffé

1923 births
1997 deaths
20th-century British historians
People educated at Eton College
Alumni of King's College, Cambridge
Alumni of the Courtauld Institute of Art
Commanders of the Order of the British Empire
Fellows of King's College, Cambridge
British art historians
English curators
Directors of museums in the United Kingdom
People associated with the Fitzwilliam Museum
Scholars of Netherlandish art
Peter Paul Rubens
Writers from London
Washington University in St. Louis faculty